The Day of Faith is a 1923 American silent drama film directed by Tod Browning starring Eleanor Boardman, Tyrone Power, Sr., and Raymond Griffith.

Plot
As described in a film magazine review, Jane Maynard opens a mission in the New York City slums in the memory of philanthropist Bland Hendricks which uses the motto "My Neighbor is Perfect." She welcomes outcasts and faith cures are made. Michael Anstell, the son of a millionaire, is attracted to Jane. His father employs reporter Tom Barnett to ridicule the mission, but Tom becomes a convert. Old John Anstell then backs the mission, believing that, in the name of reform, he can control the world. Detected, his son Michael is killed by a mob. Tom Barnett and Jane Maynard carry on the mission's work.

Cast

Preservation
With no prints of The Day of Faith located in any film archives, it is a lost film.

References

External links

Additional lobby poster
Stills at silentfilmstillarchive.com
Stills at silenthollywood.com

1923 films
1923 drama films
Silent American drama films
American silent feature films
American black-and-white films
Films directed by Tod Browning
Lost American films
Lost drama films
1923 lost films
1920s American films